Praniti Sushilkumar Shinde is a politician from Maharashtra, India. She is a member of  Indian National Congress and a three-time Maharashtra Member of Legislative Assembly, elected from Solapur City Central constituency. She is also Working President of Maharashtra Pradesh Congress Committee from 2021 and member of the screening committee of Kerala Pradesh Congress Committee for assembly elections.

Early life and career
Praniti Shinde was born on 9 December 1980 to Ujwala Shinde and Sushilkumar Shinde, former Ministry of Home Affairs (India). She completed her graduation from St. Xavier's College, Mumbai.
Praniti Shinde is a social worker helping people through her NGO JaiJui.

References

External links 
 Praniti Shinde on Twitter @ShindePraniti
 Praniti Shinde on Instagram @pranitisshinde

Indian National Congress politicians from Maharashtra
Living people
Women members of the Maharashtra Legislative Assembly
People from Solapur
Maharashtra MLAs 2009–2014
Maharashtra MLAs 2014–2019
Maharashtra MLAs 2019–2024
Marathi politicians
21st-century Indian women politicians
21st-century Indian politicians
1980 births